Dastjerd-e Sofla (also Romanized as Dastjerd-e Soflá) is a village in Dastjerd Rural District, Alamut-e Gharbi District, Qazvin County, Qazvin Province, Iran. At the 2006 census, its population was 95, in 36 families.

References 

Populated places in Qazvin County